Leo Vaz (June 6, 1890 – March 5, 1973), writer, teacher and journalist in Brazil. He was the author of novels and short stories in a satirical style

Biography 
Leonel Vaz de Barros was born in Capivari. He graduated from the Normal School as a teacher in 1911 and taught in the cities of Sao Paulo and Recife( Escola de Navegação) until 1918.

As a journalist, he began writing for the newspaper of Piracicaba.

In 1918 he moved to Sao Paulo and, with the support of Monteiro Lobato and Oswald de Andrade, embraced a journalistic career, writing for periodicals such as Jornal do Brasil, Jornal do Comércio, O Estado de Sao Paulo, where he was editor, secretary and director, until his retirement in 1951

As a journalist made a brilliant career as Sud Menucci, Guilherme de Almeida, Afonso Schmidt, Galeão Coutinho, Paulo Gonçalves and Nestor Pestana

In 1969, although retired, he returned to writing in the Estado de São Paulo, where he remained until his death in March 1973.  He died, aged 82, in São Paulo.

Works 

 Professor Jeremias (1920)
 Ritinha e outros casos (1923)
 O Burrico Lúcio (1951): tells the story of "The Golden Ass" of Lucian of Samosata;
 Páginas Vadias (1957)

Bibliography 
 Koshiyama, Alice Mitika. Monteiro Lobato: Intellectual, empresário, editor.  São Paulo: Editora EdUSP, 2006. 
 Fernando, Jorge. Vida, obra e época de Paulo Setúbal: Um homem de alma ardente.  São Paulo: Editora Geração Editorial, 2003. v. 2

References

External links 
 – Capivari – solidarity movement

1890 births
1973 deaths
People from Capivari
Brazilian male novelists
20th-century Brazilian novelists
20th-century Brazilian male writers